Waterstonella grantonensis is a species of fossil crustacean so distinct from other crustaceans that it has been placed in its own genus, Waterstonella, family, Waterstonellidae, and order, Waterstonellidea. It is named after Charles Waterstone, keeper of geology at the Royal Scottish Museum, while the specific epithet commemorates the location where the fossil was found, the Granton shrimp beds, near Edinburgh.

References

Prehistoric crustacean genera
Carboniferous crustaceans
Prehistoric life of Europe